Local group may refer to:

 The Local Group, a system of nearby galaxies
 A locally compact group, a mathematic generalization of a topological group

See also  
 Local (disambiguation)
 Localization (disambiguation)